Hoosier Heritage Conference is an athletic and extra/co-curricular activity conference of Indiana high schools. The conference formed in 1993. It is formed of Madison, Hancock, Henry, Shelby, and Delaware Counties.

Membership

Current members

 New Castle was removed from the NCC in 2013. The HHC was able to include them in some competitions during the 2013-14 school year, with full membership granted for the next year.

Former Members

Academic events include HHC Spell Bowl, Quiz Bowl, and Academic Super Bowl.  Conference champions are determined for each sport and academic event.  In addition, the HHC conference recognizes academic achievement among athletes, awarding a plaque to individuals who are letter winners, in grades 10-12, and who rank in the top five percent of their class.

IHSAA State Champions
IHSAA State Champions

Delta Eagles (9)
 1981 Wrestling
 1982 Wrestling
 1983 Wrestling
 1984 Wrestling
 1985 Wrestling
 2001 Volleyball (3A)
 2002 Volleyball (3A)
 2002 Boys Basketball (3A)
 2009 Volleyball (3A)

Greenfield-Central Cougars (1)
 1973 Football (2A)

Mt. Vernon Marauders (3)
 2000 Softball (2A)
 2013 Girls Basketball (3A)
 2021 Football (4A)

New Castle Trojans (6)
 1932 Boys Basketball
 2006 Boys Basketball (3A)
 2007 Volleyball (4A)
 2017 Volleyball (3A)
 2018 Volleyball (3A)
 2019 Volleyball (4A)

New Palestine Dragons (10)
 2004 Baseball (3A)
 2004 Softball (3A)
 2008 Softball (3A)
 2009 Softball (3A)
 2014 Football (4A)
 2017 Softball (3A)
 2018 Football (5A)
 2018 Softball (3A)
 2019 Football (5A)
 2019 Softball (3A)

Shelbyville Golden Bears(1)
 1947 Boys Basketball

Yorktown Tigers (7)
 1975 Boys Golf
 1977 Girls' Golf
 2000 Volleyball (3A)
 2011 Volleyball (3A)
 2012 Girls' Golf
 2016 Volleyball (3A)
 2018 Volleyball (4A)
 2020 Volleyball (4A)

References 

 IHSAA Conferences
 IHSAA Directory
 HHC website

Indiana high school athletic conferences